Leka, Prince of Albania (Leka Anwar Zog Reza Baudouin Msiziwe Zogu, born 26 March 1982) is a claimant to the defunct throne of Albania and the head of the House of Zogu.

At the time of his birth on 26 March 1982, the South African government, by order of Prime Minister P. W. Botha, declared his maternity ward extraterritorial land, so as to ensure that Leka was born on Albanian soil. Leka is the only child of Leka, Crown Prince of Albania and his wife Susan, Crown Princess of Albania. He is the only grandchild of King Zog I of the Albanians, succeeding as head of the royal house upon the death of his father in 2011. He has worked as an official at the country's interior and foreign ministries. He also served as a political advisor to the Albanian President from 2012 to 2013.

In May 2010, Leka became engaged to Elia Zaharia, an Albanian actress and singer. They married on 8 October 2016 in Tirana.

Early life
Leka is the son of the pretender to the defunct throne of Albania, Crown Prince Leka, and his Australian wife Crown Princess Susan.

He was named in honour of Egyptian president Anwar El Sadat, his grandfather King Zog I, Emperor Mohammed Reza of Iran, and Baudouin I, King of the Belgians. Msiziwe is a Zulu term meaning 'the one who was assisted'. Leka is a member of the House of Zogu.

Education and activities
Leka's was educated in South Africa at St Peter's College, Johannesburg, and in the United Kingdom at the Royal Military Academy Sandhurst, where he was named Best Foreign Student of the Academy, being congratulated by the Albanian Minister of Defence. He was also educated at the Skanderbeg Military Academy in Albania, at the Università per Stranieri in Perugia, where he studied the Italian language, and in Kosovo, where he studied international relations. 

Leka resides in Tirana. He speaks Albanian, English, some Zulu, and Italian. He owns boxer dogs, and his interests include martial arts, volleyball, and swimming. He is fond of wildlife and has taken part in mountain climbing, abseiling, and target shooting.

On 5 April 2004, Leka accepted the Mother Teresa Medal on behalf of his late grandmother, Queen Géraldine, for her humanitarian efforts.

Leka is known to have worked with youth organizations, like MJAFT!, and supported a wide range of humanitarian efforts in Albania, but he maintains that he only supports self-help projects to stimulate Albanian and Kosovar economic growth, Gazeta Sot.

Leka is known as a supporter of Kosovar independence from Serbia and has close ties to the Kosovar leadership in Pristina.

Leka founded the youth leadership of the Movement for National Development, which was a movement created by his father in 2005 to change the political face of Albania.

On 24 June 2010, Prince Leka unveiled a blue plaque at Parmoor House in Buckinghamshire, United Kingdom, which was the home of King Zog during his wartime exile.

Public service
On 21 August 2007, Foreign Minister Lulzim Basha announced that Leka had been appointed to his office. The prince intended to pursue a career in diplomacy. After three years he had been transferred to the office of the Minister of Interior. After the election of Bujar Nishani as president in 2012, Leka was appointed as political adviser to the President.

Leka was considered as a candidate in the 2022 Albanian presidential election, though the position ultimately went to Bajram Begaj.

Personal life
Leka met Elia Zaharia in Paris, and in May 2010 they were engaged. Since then she has accompanied him on most of his visits and meetings with members of royal families. She is also head of the Queen Geraldine Foundation, which is a humanitarian, charitable and non-profit organisation, created by the Royal Court. The foundation aims to be close to the Albanian families who need help and to children who need care. It has reconstructed numerous schools and kindergartens in northern Albania, especially in the Mat District, from where the Zogu Family comes.

On 27 March 2016 it was announced by Skënder Zogu (born 1933), a member of the Zogu family, that the couple would be married on 8 October 2016 in the Royal Palace in Tirana.

Wedding

Leka was married on Saturday 8 October 2016 in Tirana. The ceremony was a semi-official ceremony, held in Tirana in the Royal Palace, with many guests including members of other noble and royal families. The event was a civil wedding officiated by the Mayor of Tirana, Erion Veliaj. A blessing was given by the five religious leaders of Albania representing the faiths of Sunni Islam, Bektashi, and the Christian traditions of Orthodox, Catholic and Protestant. This tradition of the Albanian royal family is part of the tradition of religious tolerance in Albania.

Wedding guests included friends and relatives from around the world including relatives of his mother from Australia. Guests also included members of other royal families from neighbouring countries and further afield. These included Queen Sofía of Spain and Prince and Princess Michael of Kent. Prince Michael of Kent is a first cousin of Queen Elizabeth II and his wife Princess Michael of Kent is related to Prince Leka through her mother, Countess Marianne Szapáry, who was a 5th cousin of Queen Géraldine and had been a bridesmaid at her wedding to King Zog in 1938. Other royal guests included Empress Farah of Iran, Crown Prince Alexander and Crown Princess Katherine of Yugoslavia, Crown Princess Margareta of Romania, Custodian of the Crown and Prince Radu of Romania, Nicholas, Prince of Montenegro, Prince Guillaume of Luxembourg together with Princess Sibilla, Georg Friedrich, Prince of Prussia, Princess Léa of Belgium and other members from the royal families of Russia, Liechtenstein, Romania, Greece, Georgia, Morocco and members of other noble families. Heads of state of Albania also attended the ceremony.

Children
Elia gave birth to a daughter on 22 October 2020 at Queen Geraldine Maternity Hospital in Tirana, on the 18th anniversary of Leka's grandmother Queen Geraldine's death. Their daughter was named Geraldine in her honour. On 28 January 2023, on the day of her baptism, her full name is Geraldine Sibilla Francesca Susan Marie.

Honours and awards

Honours

National dynastic honours
  House of Zogu: Sovereign Knight with Collar of the Royal Order of Albania
  House of Zogu: Sovereign Knight Grand Cross of the Order of Fidelity
  House of Zogu: Sovereign Knight Grand Cross of the Order of Skanderbeg
  Albanian Royal Family: Sovereign of the Military Order and Medal of Bravery

Foreign honours
  Italian Royal Family: Knight Grand Cross of the Royal Order of Saints Maurice and Lazarus
  Two Sicilian Royal Family: Knight Grand Cross of the Royal Order of Francis I
 House of Romanov: Knight Grand Cross of the Imperial Order of Saint Andrew
  Royal House of Ghassan: Knight Grand Collar of the Equestrian Order of Michael Archangel

Awards
 – Honored Citizen of the City of Burrel (2012)
 – Honored Citizen of the Commune of Bërdicë (2012)
 – Key to City of New Orleans (2011)
 – Honorary Mayor of the City of Baton Rouge

See also 
 Heads of former ruling families

References

Bibliography
 Patrice Najbor, Histoire de l'Albanie et de sa maison royale (5 volumes), JePublie, Paris, 2008,.
 Patrice Najbor, la dynastye des Zogu, Textes & Prétextes, Paris, 2002
 Geraldine of the Albanians; Robyns, Gwen – 
 Rees, Neil: A Royal Exile – King Zog & Queen Geraldine of Albania including their wartime exile in the Thames Valley and Chilterns, 2010

External links

Official website of the Albanian Royal Court
Site Officiel de la Maison Royale d'Albanie
Histoire de l'Albanie et de sa Maison Royale 1443-2007
L'Albanie et le sauvetage des Juifs

1982 births
Living people
People from Johannesburg
Albanian princes
Albanian people of American descent
Albanian people of Hungarian descent
House of Zogu
Graduates of the Royal Military Academy Sandhurst
Recipients of the Order of Saints Maurice and Lazarus
Australian people of English descent
Albanian nobility
Pretenders to the Albanian throne
Albanian royalty